Isotomurus tricolor is a species of elongate-bodied springtails in the family Isotomidae.

References

Entomobryomorpha
Articles created by Qbugbot
Animals described in 1873